Lue Amnat is a district (amphoe) in the southern part of Amnat Charoen province, northeastern Thailand.

Geography
Neighboring districts are (from the west clockwise): Hua Taphan, Mueang Amnat Charoen, Phana of Amnat Charoen Province, and Muang Sam Sip of Ubon Ratchathani province.

History
The minor district (king amphoe) was created on 1 April 1991, when six tambons were split off from Mueang Amnat Charoen district. In 1993 it was one of the districts which formed the newly created Amnat Charoen Province. The minor district was upgraded to a full district on 5 December 1996.

Administration
The district is divided into seven sub-districts (tambons), which are further subdivided into 79 villages (mubans). Amnat is a township (thesaban tambon) which covers parts of tambon Amnat. There are a further seven tambon administrative organizations (TAO).

References

External links
amphoe.com

Lue Amnat